Gary MacLaren is a Republican member of the Montana Legislature. He was elected to House District 89 which represents a portion of the Ravalli County area.

References

Living people
1942 births
Republican Party members of the Montana House of Representatives
University of California, Berkeley alumni
People from Victor, Montana